USS YOG-42 was a gasoline barge built by Concrete Ship Constructors, in National City, California. She was launched on March 23, 1943. Acquired by the United States Navy on May 23, 1943. She was assigned to the Asiatic-Pacific Theater, and survived the war. Re-designated YOGN-42 in May 1946, she was struck from the Naval Register on August 15, 1949. Sometime the next year, she was intentionally beached on the north coast of Lanai, Hawaiian Islands.

Construction 

USS YOG-42 was built by Concrete Ship Constructors, in National City, California as Concrete No. 5 a non-self-propelled, Maritime Commission, type B7-A2, barge- hull (MC 638). She was laid down on December 6, 1942, and launched on March 23, 1943. Acquired by the United States Navy on May 23, 1943, USS YOG-42 was assigned to the Asiatic-Pacific Theater.

Service in World War II 
Tug , towing gasoline barge YOG-42, was sunk by Japanese submarine I-39, 150 miles east of Espiritu Santo on September 12, 1943. On December 31, 1943,  reported 22 men assigned to YOG-42. YOG-42 survived the Pacific War and continued to supply gasoline throughout the conflict.

Shipwreck 

Re-designated YOGN-42 in May 1946, she was struck from the Naval Register on August 15, 1949. Sometime the next year, she was intentionally beached on the north coast of Lanai, Hawaiian Islands, where she can be seen to this day. The United States Navy has recommended the wreck of YOGN-42 for protected status in the National Register of Historic Places for cultural preservation as a Lanai tourist attraction.

References

External links 
 navsource.org
 shipscribe.com
 Fold3:Navy Muster Rolls of YOG-42
 Department of Defense Legacy Resource Management Program

Tankers of the United States Navy

Tankers of the United States

1943 ships
Ships built in California
Maritime incidents in 1949
Shipwrecks of Hawaii